Claus Lamm (born in 1973 in Lustenau, Austria) is a Professor of Biological Psychology and the head of the Social, Cognitive and Affective Neuroscience Unit at the Faculty of Psychology of the University of Vienna. His research focuses on the psychological and biological mechanisms underlying social cognition, affect, and behavior. His main research interest are the neural underpinnings of empathy, to whose understanding he has made pioneering contributions.

Academic career and achievements

Claus Lamm received his Diploma and Ph.D. in Psychology from the University of Vienna. He then joined the lab of Jean Decety, first at the French Institute of Health and Medical Research (INSERM) in Bron, France (2005), and then at the University of Chicago (2006-2008). Subsequently, he joined Tania Singer’s  research group at the Laboratory of Social and Neural Systems Research (founded by Ernst Fehr, University of Zurich). 
In 2010, Claus Lamm returned to the University of Vienna as a Professor of Biological Psychology.

He is the director and founder of the Social, Cognitive and Affective Neuroscience Unit, and currently also the Vice Dean of the Faculty of Psychology. Claus Lamm is a board member of the Cognitive Science Research Platform. He also established and directs the MRI Center of the University of Vienna. Together with Ludwig Huber he directs one of only a handful of comparative canine neuroimaging facilities that currently exist worldwide.

In 2014, he was elected to become a corresponding member of the Austrian Academy of Sciences, and he received the Elisabeth Lutz Prize by the same institution in recognition for his work on the biological and neural bases of social behavior.

His research examines human social behavior using an interdisciplinary, multi-level approach. He combines behavioral and experimental psychology with methods from neuroimaging, electroencephalography, transcranial brain stimulation, psychopharmacology and psychoneuroendocrinology. He also actively collaborates with clinical investigators  and with cognitive biologists. 
In several papers published in journals such as Proceedings of the National Academy of Sciences, Philosophical Transactions of the Royal Society B, Journal of Neuroscience, and NeuroImage, Lamm and his collaborators were able to show that empathy is a complex construct for which two main components are essential: shared affective representations, and self-other distinction. More recently, he could show using the phenomenon of placebo analgesia that empathy for pain is grounded in self-experienced pain  More recently, he also engages in comparative research, using behavioral  and neuroscience  approaches to gain a deeper understanding of the convergent evolution of empathy and related phenomena.

Selected works

 Tomova, L., Majdandzic, J., Hummer, A., Windischberger, C., Heinrichs, M. & Lamm, C. (2016). Increased neural responses to empathy for pain might explain how acute stress increases prosociality. Social Cognitive and Affective Neuroscience. doi: 10.1093/scan/nsw146
 Lamm, C., Bukowski, H., & Silani, G. (2016). From shared to distinct self–other representations in empathy: evidence from neurotypical function and socio-cognitive disorders. Philosophical Transactions of the Royal Society B, 371: 20150083. doi:10.1098/rstb.2015.0083
 Lamm, C.*, Silani, G.* & Singer, T. (2015). Distinct neural networks underlying empathy for pleasant and unpleasant touch. Cortex, 70, 79-89. doi:10.1016/j.cortex.2015.01.021
 Rütgen M., Seidel, E. M., Silani, G., Riecansky, G., Hummer, A., Windischberger, C., Petrovic, P. & Lamm, C. (2015). Placebo analgesia and its opioidergic regulation suggest that empathy for pain is grounded in self pain. Proceedings of the National Academy of Sciences, 112(41), E5638-E5646. doi:10.1073/pnas.1511269112
 Rütgen, M., Seidel, E.M., Riecansky, I., Lamm, C. (2015). Reduction of empathy for pain by placebo analgesia suggests functional equivalence of empathy and first-hand emotion experience. Journal of Neuroscience, 35(23): 8938-8947. doi: 10.1523/JNEUROSCI.3936-14.2015
 Lamm C. & Majdandžić Y. (2015). The role of shared neural activations, mirror neurons, and morality in empathy – A critical comment. Neuroscience Research, 90, 15-24. doi:10.1016/j.neures.2014.10.008 
 Tomova, L., von Dawans, B., Heinrichs, M., Silani, G., Lamm, C. (2014). Is stress affecting our ability to tune into others? Evidence for gender differences in the effects of stress on self-other distinction. Psychoneuroendocrinology, 43, 95—104. doi:10.1016/j.psyneuen.2014.02.006
 Lamm, C., Decety, J., & Singer, T. (2011). Meta-analytic evidence for common and distinct neural networks associated with directly experienced pain and empathy for pain. NeuroImage, 54(3), 2492-2502. doi:10.1016/j.neuroimage.2010.10.014
 Decety, J., & Lamm, C. (2007). The role of the right temporoparietal junction in social interaction: How low-level computational processes contribute to meta-cognition. The Neuroscientist, 13(6), 580-593. doi:10.1177/1073858407304654
 Lamm, C., Batson, C.D., & Decety, J. (2007). The neural substrate of human empathy: Effects of perspective-taking and cognitive appraisal. Journal of Cognitive Neuroscience, 19(1), 42-58.  doi:10.1162/jocn.2007.19.1.42
 Singer, T.*, & Lamm, C.* (2009). The social neuroscience of empathy. Annals of the New York Academy of Science, 1156, 81-96.(review) doi:10.1111/j.1749-6632.2009.04418.x

References

External links
 Claus Lamm's homepage at the University of Vienna

Academic staff of the University of Vienna
1973 births
Living people